Attila Repka (born January 10, 1968, in Miskolc) is a Hungarian wrestler and Olympic champion in Greco-Roman wrestling.

Olympics
Repka competed at the 1992 Summer Olympics in Barcelona where he received a gold medal in Greco-Roman wrestling, the lightweight class.

References

External links
 
 

1968 births
Living people
Olympic wrestlers of Hungary
Wrestlers at the 1988 Summer Olympics
Wrestlers at the 1992 Summer Olympics
Wrestlers at the 1996 Summer Olympics
Hungarian male sport wrestlers
Olympic gold medalists for Hungary
Sportspeople from Miskolc
Olympic medalists in wrestling
Medalists at the 1992 Summer Olympics
20th-century Hungarian people